This a list of political biography films. It includes any biographical films about politicians, heads of state, or people who were otherwise mainly known for their political involvement.

Australia 
Bob Hawke, Prime Minister.
 Hawke

China 
Puyi
 The Last Emperor
Mao Zedong
 Mao Zedong 1949
Deng Xiaoping
 Deng Xiaoping

Germany 
Adolf Hitler
 Downfall

India 
Narendra Modi
 PM Narendra Modi

Italy 
Giulio Andreotti, Prime Minister.
Il divo
Silvio Berlusconi, Prime Minister.
Loro
Alcide De Gasperi, Prime Minister.
 Anno uno

Philippines
Manuel L. Quezon, President
 Quezon's Game

Russia (incl. Soviet Union) 
Joseph Stalin
 The Death of Stalin

South Africa 
Nelson Mandela
 Mandela: Long Walk to Freedom

Uganda 
Idi Amin
 The Last King of Scotland

United Kingdom 
Elizabeth I
 Elizabeth
Elizabeth II
 The Queen
Margaret Thatcher
 Margaret
 The Iron Lady 

Tony Blair
 The Deal
 The Special Relationship

United States 

George W. Bush, 43rd president.
W.
Lyndon B. Johnson, 36th president.
LBJ
John F. Kennedy, 35th president.
JFK
Ted Kennedy, senator.
Chappaquiddick
Abraham Lincoln, 16th president.
Lincoln
Richard Nixon, 37th president.
Nixon
Harvey Milk, San Francisco council member.
Milk
Dick Cheney, 46th vice president.
Vice

References 

Biographical films about politicians
Political films